This is a list of beaches in Jamaica.  There are over 50 public beaches in Jamaica. Some make an entry charge (for use of facilities) and have security guards.  Many sea-front hotels are able to control access to what is effectively their private beach. They may, for a fee, allow non-residents to gain access and use their facilities.

Beaches in Jamaica
Beaches in Jamaica include the following:

 Alligator Pond, 
 Barnswell Beach, 
 Billys Bay, 
 Bluefields Beach, 
 Boston Beach, 
 Buccaneer Beach, 
 Calabash Bay, 
 Cornwall Beach, 
 Doctor's Cave Beach Club, 
 Farquhars Beach, 
 Font Hill Beach, 
 Frenchmans Bay, 
 Frenchman's Cove, 
 Great Pedro Bay
 Gunboat Beach, 
 Gut River
 Harmony Beach, 
 Hellshire Beach, 
 James Bond Beach, 
 Long Bay Beach
 Negril
 Ocean View Beach
 Puerto Sico Beach, 
 Rose Hall
 Sugarman Beach, 
 Treasure Beach, 
 Whitehouse Beach, 
 Winifred Beach,

See also
 List of beaches
 List of islands of Jamaica

References

 Beaches of Jamaica
Jamaica
Beaches
Beaches
Jamaica